PP–DB is an electoral coalition between We Continue the Change and Democratic Bulgaria in Bulgaria. The two groups merged prior to the 2023 election.

Background

Bulgarian political crisis 

Following numerous corruption scandals linked to the governing GERB party, several anti-corruption parties made breakthroughs in the April 2021 election. One of such parties was the liberal-conservative group, Democratic Bulgaria (DB). Due to the resulting political deadlock, no government could be formed and the country would go onto face two further elections in 2021, one in July and one in November. Before the November election, two popular ministers from Stefan Yanev's first interim government, Kiril Petkov and Asen Vasilev formed a new centrist political force, the We Continue the Change (PP). PP would go on to win the November election, and negotiated a government with DB, alongside the Socialist Party (BSP) and another anti-corruption party There Is Such a People (ITN).

The government fell after less than 7 months in power, after ITN pulled out due to disagreements over the Budget and Macedonian accession to the European Union. The government was voted out in a Vote of No Confidence. President Rumen Radev called an election in October 2022, in which PP fell back to second behind GERB. No government could be formed as a result of the election, and so a further election is to be held in April 2023.

Formation 
The alliance was announced on 10 February 2023. The alliance's stated aim is to get the most votes in the April 2023 election, giving them the first chance of forming a government. A joint declaration titled "We Continue Together" was signed on 13 February 2023 by representatives of PP, Yes, Bulgaria!, Democrats for a Strong Bulgaria, and the Green Movement (ZD), formally announcing the formation of the alliance.

Issues with regional lists 
There were disagreements between members of the alliance over the orders and members of regional lists.

Prior to the final announcement and submission of the regional lists, some figures in PP either left the party or threatened to leave it. Notably, a prominent PP Member of Parliament (MP) from Pleven, Ivan Hristanov, declared that he would be leaving PP, and would not participate in the upcoming elections. There was speculation that he left due to conflicts with the leader of the list in the Pleven Electoral District. Petkov denied that this was the case. 

PP MP from Sofia Oblast, Alexander Dunchev, announced he would not be contesting the election and would leave PP, due to a DB member being placed if a DB member was as the leader of the list, calling that decision a "betrayal". 

Chairman of the PP Parliamentary Group, Andrey Gyurev, denied that any "under the table" negotiations about list leaders were on-going and that all list leaders would be chosen based on merit. Gyurev confirmed that the PP Executive Council would meet on 22 February to finalise the list with DB. 

On 27 February, a day before lists were to be announced, disagreements broke out in Blagoevgrad Province. This led to DB MP and lawyer, Ivan Dimitrov, who had been selected to be third on the local list, to announce that he would be withdrawing from politics, citing problems with the joint list as one of his reasons.

Election campaign

2023 election 
The PP–DB coalition began its campaign on 19 February at an open air event in front of the National Theater in Sofia. The event was attended by PP co-leaders, Petkov and Vasilev, Panev, the leader of ZD, DSB leader Atanas Atanasov, independent former BSP MP Yavor Bozhankov, as well as leaders of public organisations which had decided to endorse the list. At this meeting, it was confirmed that Yavor Bozhankov will lead the list in Gabrovo, additionally that PP–DB stated that they represent the "good forces" in Bulgarian politics, as opposed to GERB, which represented a return to the past.

On 3 March, Bulgarian Liberation Day, PP–DB unveiled their slogan "There is a Way" at an event. The alliance called for Bulgarians to come together to fight for change, proposing five steps that would ensure a "good European life for all Bulgarians". The five steps are as follows:
Joining the Eurozone in 2023
Joining the Schengen area in 2023
Investing millions into regional development, including especially strengthening farms
Diversifying Bulgaria's energy supply
Guaranteeing quality healthcare and education for all Bulgarians

Ideology and platform 
In their joint declaration the coalition laid out their main policy proposals in 13 points, including:

 Equal rights for all Bulgarian citizens
 Judicial reform and equality before the law
 Improving conditions for development of private business
 Lowering carbon emissions and implementing environmental protection
 Working towards energy independence
 Further integration with the European Union and NATO and joining the Schengen Area and the Eurozone

Composition

Members 
The coalition was registered ahead of the 2023 election and includes the following six parties: It has been speculated that independents, and members of other public movements may also enter the lists of the coalition, so far it has been announced that former BSP MP, Yavor Bozhankov, will lead the list in Gabrovo.

Affiliated groups

Potential members 
The following parties have expresssed interest in joining the coalition:

References 

2023 establishments in Bulgaria
Liberal parties in Bulgaria
Political parties established in 2023
Political party alliances in Bulgaria
Pro-European political parties in Bulgaria